Ján Homer (born 11 December 1980) is a Slovak ice hockey player who is currently playing for JKH GKS Jastrzębie of the Polska Hokej Liga.

Career
Homer began playing junior ice hockey in your hometown club HK Dubnica. He signed for the Czech Extraliga team HC Zlín in 2009. He overall played 89 games in the Czech Extraliga, earning 11 points. He returned to the Slovak Extraliga in 2003, signing contract for the HK Dukla Trenčín. In the 2003–04 season he won Slovak championship for Dukla. He won the Slovak title again in the 2009–10 and 2010–11 season for HC Košice.

External links

1980 births
Living people
People from Dubnica nad Váhom
Sportspeople from the Trenčín Region
Slovak ice hockey defencemen
Buran Voronezh players
HC '05 Banská Bystrica players
HC Košice players
PSG Berani Zlín players
HK 36 Skalica players
HK Dukla Trenčín players
HK Neman Grodno players
HKM Zvolen players
JKH GKS Jastrzębie players
LHK Jestřábi Prostějov players
MsHK Žilina players
Saale Bulls Halle players
Saryarka Karagandy players
ŠHK 37 Piešťany players
SK Horácká Slavia Třebíč players
Slovak expatriate ice hockey players in the Czech Republic
Slovak expatriate ice hockey players in Russia
Slovak expatriate ice hockey players in Germany
Expatriate ice hockey players in Poland
Expatriate ice hockey players in Kazakhstan
Expatriate ice hockey players in Belarus
Slovak expatriate sportspeople in Kazakhstan
Slovak expatriate sportspeople in Poland
Slovak expatriate sportspeople in Belarus